Eindhoven Kemphanen is an ice hockey club in Eindhoven, The Netherlands. They played in the Dutch Cup and the Eredivisie) until season 2017-2018, the highest-level hockey division in the Netherlands.  Home games are played at the IJssportcentrum Eindhoven.

History

Eindhoven ice hockey began in the 1970s with the construction of a hockey arena.  Eindhoven Kemphanen (Kemphanen, "fighting roosters" in English, is a play on words using the name of the "Kempen" region) first played in the Eredivisie in 1981-82 and played intermittently in the Eredivisie in the 1980s and 1990s.  The highlight of this period was winning the Netherlands cup competition in 1986.  The team returned to the Eredivisie in 2008-09 for the first time since 1996-97.

Season results

Note: GP = Games played, W = Wins, OTW = Overtime Wins, OTL = Overtime Losses, L = Losses, GF = Goals for, GA = Goals against, Pts = Points

Championships

Eredivisie National Championships

None.

 Netherlands Cup Winners

Once: 1986

External links
  
 Netherlands Ice Hockey Union 
 Ijshockey.com information on the Eredivisie teams 

Ice hockey teams in the Netherlands
Ice hockey clubs established in 1981
Sports clubs in Eindhoven